Coutures is the name of several communes in France:

 Coutures, Dordogne, in the Dordogne department
 Coutures, Gironde, in the Gironde department
 Coutures, Maine-et-Loire, in the Maine-et-Loire department
 Coutures, Tarn-et-Garonne, in the Tarn-et-Garonne department